Cheung Chi-kong, GBS (born 1959 in Hong Kong) is a former non-official member of the Executive Council of Hong Kong, author, and   His writing and political views are known to be adhering strongly to the Chinese Communist Party.

Background
Cheung obtained his Bachelor of Social Science and Master of Business Administration from Chinese University of Hong Kong.  He is also the executive director of the One Country Two Systems Research Institute.

Honours
Cheung was awarded with Bronze Bauhinia Star in 2011.

References

Government officials of Hong Kong
Living people
1959 births
Recipients of the Bronze Bauhinia Star
Recipients of the Gold Bauhinia Star
Members of the 13th Chinese People's Political Consultative Conference
Members of the National Committee of the Chinese People's Political Consultative Conference